Edgar Grospiron (born 17 March 1969) is a French freestyle skier and Olympic champion. He won a gold medal at the 1992 Winter Olympics in Albertville. He received a bronze medal at the 1994 Winter Olympics in Lillehammer. At the 2012 Winter Youth Olympics he was Chef de mission for the French Team.  He was in charge of the Annecy bid for the 2018 Winter Olympics, which did not win.

External links
 Edgar Grospiron Consulting

References

1969 births
Living people
French male freestyle skiers
Freestyle skiers at the 1988 Winter Olympics
Freestyle skiers at the 1992 Winter Olympics
Freestyle skiers at the 1994 Winter Olympics
Olympic gold medalists for France
Olympic bronze medalists for France
Olympic medalists in freestyle skiing
Medalists at the 1992 Winter Olympics
Medalists at the 1994 Winter Olympics
Olympic freestyle skiers of France